Adarsha Hindu Hotel is a Bengali drama film directed by Ardhendu Sen based on the same name novel of Bibhutibhushan Bandyopadhyay. This film was released on 31 May 1957 under the banner of Sreelekha Pictures.

Plot
The plot revolves with two rival hotels near Ranaghat railway station. One run by Bechu Chakraborty with an excellent cook, Hajari Thakur. Padma, a maidservant of the hotel, steals some utensils and falsely alleges Hajari and the police arrest him. After release from the jail, Hajari starts his new business of Adarsha Hindu Hotel which becomes most popular in the town. He gets the railway contract to start the hotel in the station.

Cast
 Chhabi Biswas
 Dhiraj Bhattacharya as Hajari Thakur
 Jahar Ganguly as Bechu
 Sabitri Chatterjee
 Tulsi Chakraborty
 Jahor Roy
 Anup Kumar
 Sova Sen
 Sandhyarani as Padma
 Sikha Bag

References

External links

1957 films
Bengali-language Indian films
Films based on Indian novels
1957 drama films
Indian drama films
Indian black-and-white films
1950s Bengali-language films
Films based on works by Bibhutibhushan Bandyopadhyay